Ysaora Jennifer Thibus (born 22 August 1991 in Guadeloupe) is a French right-handed foil fencer, 2022 individual world champion, three-time Olympian, and 2021 team Olympic silver medalist.

Biography 
Ysaora Thibus is studying at the ESCP Business School. In 2013, she received the Bernard Destremau Prize from the Académie des sciences morales et politiques, which rewards a high-level athlete who combines competition and higher education.

Thibus took up fencing at the age of 7 in Guadeloupe.  At 17, she moved to France to train with the French national youth team in Aix-en-Provence, joining the senior training team in Paris a year later.

Thibus competed in the 2012 London Olympic Games. In 2016, after winning her first team bronze medal at the Rio Worlds in April, she participated in the 2016 Rio de Janeiro Olympic Games.

She reached her first individual world podium in 2017 in Leipzig with a third place, then in 2018 in Wuxi where she lost 12-15 in the final to Alice Volpi.

In 2021, she won a silver medal in the team foil event with Anita Blaze, Astrid Guyart and Pauline Ranvier at the Tokyo Olympic Games, losing in the final to the Russian team. Beaten in the second round in individual, she said she was "psychologically exhausted" after the Olympic competition and stopped training for four months.

Thibus founded the EssentiElle program for women athletes, which aims to amplify their voices within the world of athletics.

Thibus and American foil fencer Race Imboden met at a party after the Rio de Janeiro Olympic Games and began dating shortly afterward. The couple became engaged at Le Pigalle, a hotel in Paris, after the Tokyo Olympic Games.

Medal record

Olympic Games

World Championship

European Championship

Grand Prix

World Cup

Awards 
 Knight of the National Order of Merit (France) on the 8th of September 2021.

References

External links
Profile – FIE
Profile – French Olympic Committee 
EuroFencing Profile
NBC Olympics Profile

1991 births
Living people
French female foil fencers
Olympic fencers of France
Fencers at the 2012 Summer Olympics
Fencers at the 2016 Summer Olympics
Universiade medalists in fencing
French people of Guadeloupean descent
People from Les Abymes
Universiade bronze medalists for France
World Fencing Championships medalists
Medalists at the 2011 Summer Universiade
Fencers at the 2020 Summer Olympics
Medalists at the 2020 Summer Olympics
Olympic medalists in fencing
Olympic silver medalists for France
21st-century French women